Larionovo is a rural locality (a village) in Pekshinskoye Rural Settlement, Petushinsky District, Vladimir Oblast, Russia. The population was 161 as of 2010. There are 14 streets.

Geography 
Larionovo is located on the right bank of the Peksha River, 28 km northeast of Petushki (the district's administrative centre) by road. Andreyevskoye is the nearest rural locality.

References 

Rural localities in Petushinsky District